Trichococcus ilyis is a bacterium from the genus Trichococcus which has been isolated from sludge from an anaerobic sulfate-reducing bioreactor from Jiangsu.

References

Lactobacillales
Bacteria described in 2016